Thiouracil may refer to:

 2-Thiouracil
 4-Thiouracil